Gioacchino Failla (19 July 1891 – 15 December 1961) was an Italian-born American physicist. A pioneer in both biophysics and radiobiology, he was particularly noted for his work on the role of radiation as a cause of cancer and genetic mutation.  He was born in Castelbuono in the  Province of Palermo and emigrated with his family to the United States in 1906. After his retirement from Columbia University's Center for Radiological Research in 1960, he was appointed Senior Scientist Emeritus in the Radiological Physics Division of the Argonne National Laboratory in Illinois. He was killed in a car accident near the laboratory at the age of 70.

Professional service
 Committee on Radiation Units, Standardization and Protection
 International Commission on Radiation Protection, ICRP
 National Commission on Radiation Protection, NCRP
 National Defense Research Committee
 Radiological Instrument Panel of the Armed Forces Special Weapons Project
 Advisory Committee on Isotope Distributions
 Advisory Committee on Biology and Medicine of the U.S. A.E.C. and the Genetics Committee
 National Academy of Sciences Committee on Biological Effects of Atomic Radiation

Honorary memberships
 British Institute of Radiology
 The James Ewing Society, American Society for the Control of Cancer, now known as the American Cancer Society
 Radiological Society of North America

Awards and honors
 Pulitzer Scholarship, awarded to graduates of grammar school that were examined for eligibility to receive one of 10 scholarships offered annually by Joseph Pulitzer. The subjects included in the written examination were grammar, dictation, reading, composition, American history, geography, and arithmetic.
 American Cancer Society Annual National Award
 Caldwell Medal of the American Roentgen Ray Society
 Leonard Prize of the American Roentgen Ray Society
 James Ewing Society Medal
 Gold Medal of the Radiological Society of North America
 1939, Janeway Medal of the American Radium Society, "Some Aspects of the Biological Action of Ionizing Radiation"
 Katherine Berkan Judd Cancer Award from MSKCC for cancer research for an investigator who has made major advances toward the control and cure of cancer.
 He received an honorary doctorate degree from the University of Rochester.

Failla Memorial Lecture
 Failla Memorial Lecture presented annually by the Greater New York Chapter of the Health Physics Society and the Radiological Medical Physics Society

Patents
Stopcock, 1925.
Method and means for applying radium emanation, 1930. 
Method and means for treatment by radiations, 1934.
Means for effecting therapeutic implantations, 1935.
Methods and means for testing radiant energy, 1937.
Testing method and apparatus, 1937.
Radiation measuring device, 1953.
Radiation meter, 1954.
Radiation detection device, 1956.
Method of using and manufacturing plastic equivalent to organic materials, 1961.

References

External links
 

1891 births
1961 deaths
People from Castelbuono
Italian emigrants to the United States
American biophysicists
Medical physicists
Fellows of the American Physical Society
20th-century American inventors
Road incident deaths in Illinois
Scientists from Sicily